Jürgen Hinrich Hewers (17 March 1924 – 15 September 2017) was a German violinist and concertmaster.

Life 
Born in Königsberg, Hewers took violin lessons from the age of 5 with his father August Hewers (concertmaster of the Königsberg Opera Orchestra and first violinist of the Königsberg String Quartet). Hewers attended the Wilhelms-Gymnasium of his home town. In 1940, he began studies with Max Strub in Berlin, which he continued with Gustav Havemann. Subsequently, he also performed in other major cities of the German Empire (Berlin, Munich, Frankfurt, Dresden and Breslau) as well as in the East Prussian province. In the same year, he was called up for military service in the Wehrmacht.

From 1946 to 1948, he was active in the Loh-Orchester Sondershausen. Afterwards, he became 1st concert master at the Anhaltisches Theater in Dessau. In 1951/52, he took over the post of Second 1st concertmaster at the Gewandhaus orchestra Leipzig. During his Leipzig years, he also taught at the University of Music and Theatre Leipzig. Afterwards, he was engaged as 1st concertmaster at the Berliner Symphoniker in East Berlin.

In 1957, he went to the Federal of Germany and worked with the Niedersächsisches Symphonie-Orchester in Hanover as well as in Ulm and Braunschweig.

Hewers was a member of the masonic lodge Leuchte im Norden in Flensburg. He died there at the age of 93.

Further reading 
 Hans-Rainer Jung, Claudius Böhm: Das Gewandhaus-Orchester. Seine Mitglieder und seine Geschichte seit 1743. Faber & Faber, Leipzig 2006, .

References

External links 
 

German classical violinists
Concertmasters
German Freemasons
1924 births
2017 deaths
Musicians from Königsberg